The Prior, then Abbot and then Commendator of Dunfermline was the head of the Benedictine monastic community of Dunfermline Abbey, Fife, Scotland. The abbey itself was founded in 1128 by King David I of Scotland, but was of earlier origin. King Máel Coluim mac Donnchada ("Malcolm III") had founded a church there with the help of Benedictines from Canterbury. Monks had been sent there in the reign of Étgar mac Maíl Choluim (Edgar, 1097–1107) and Anselm had sent a letter requesting that Étgar's brother and successor King Alaxandair mac Maíl Coluim (Alexander I, 1107–1124) protect these monks. By 1120, when Alaxandair sent a delegation to Canterbury to secure Eadmer for the bishopric of St Andrews, there is a Prior of the Dunfermline monks by the name of Peter leading the delegation. Control of the abbey was secularized in the 16th century and after the accession of James Stewart in 1500, the abbey was held by commendators. In the second half of the 16th century, the abbey's lands were being carved up into lordships and it was finally annexed to the crown in July, 1593.

List of Priors
 Peter, 1120
 Richard Mongal, 1133-1148

List of Abbots
 Geoffrey I, 1148–1154
 Geoffrey II, 1154–1178
 Archibald, 1178–1198
 Robert de Berwick, 1198–1202
 Patrick, 1202–1217x1223
 William I, 1223
 William II, 1223 x 1226–1238
 Geoffrey III, 1238–1240
 Robert de Keldeleth, 1240–1252
 John, 1252–1256
 Matthew, 1256
 Simon, 1267–1275
 Radulf de Greenlaw, 1275–1296
 Hugh, 1304x1306-1313
 Robert de Crail, 1314–1328
 Alexander Ber, c. 1328-9-1350 x 1351
 John Black, 1351
 John de Stramiglot, 1351–1383x1388
 William de Angus, 1383
 John de Torry, 1388–1409
 William de St Andrews (Anderston), 1413–1426
 Robert de Scotland, 1418–1419
 William Brown, 1427
 Andrew de Kirkcaldy, 1427–1444 
 Richard de Bothwell, 1444–1468
 Alexander Thomson, c. 1470
 Henry Crichton, 1471–1482
 Adam Cant, 1483–1490
 George Crichton, 1490–1500
 Opposed by Raphael Riario, 1491–1492
 Opposed by Robert Swinton, 1492
 Opposed by Thomas Cranston, 1492
 Opposed by Andrew Pictoris, 1492

List of Commendators
 James Stewart, 1500–1504
 Gilbert Strachan, 1504
 James Beaton, 1504–1509
 Alexander Stewart, 1509–1513
 James Hepburn, 1513–1516
 Peter de Accoltis, 1514
 Andrew Forman, 1514–1521
 James Beaton (again), 1522–1539
 George Durie, 1526/39–1572
 Robert Pitcairn, 1553/72–1584
 Henry Pitcairn, 1582/4–1593
 Patrick, Master of Gray, 1585–1587
 George, Earl of Huntly, 1587

Notes

Bibliography
 Cowan, Ian B. & Easson, David E., Medieval Religious Houses: Scotland With an Appendix on the Houses in the Isle of Man, Second Edition, (London, 1976), pp. 58–59
 Watt, D.E.R. & Shead, N.F. (eds.), The Heads of Religious Houses in Scotland from the 12th to the 16th Centuries (The Scottish Records Society, New Series, Volume 24), (Edinburgh, 2001), p. 67–73

 *
Lists of abbots
Abbot of Dunfermline